Raninagar is an Upazila of Naogaon District in the Division of Rajshahi, Bangladesh.

Geography

It has 29198 households and total area 258.33 km2.

The upazila is bounded by naogaon sadar and adamdighi upazilas on the north, atrai upazila on the south, nandigram and singra upazilas on the east and manda upazila on the west.

Demographics
According to 2011 Bangladesh census, Raninagar had a population of 184,778. Males constituted 49.59% of the population and females 50.41%. Muslims formed 89.19% of the population, Hindus 10.78%, Christians 0.03% and others 0.01%. Raninagar had a literacy rate of 46.04% for the population 7 years and above.

As of the 1991 Bangladesh census, Raninagar has a population of 158244. Males constituted 50.94% of the population, and females 49.06%. This Upazila's eighteen up population was 79,136. Raninagar had an average literacy rate of 28.4% (7+ years), and the national average of 32.4% literate.

Administration
Raninagar, primarily formed as a Thana in 1916, was turned into an upazila in 1983.

The upazila is divided into eight union parishads: Bargachha, Ekdala, Gona, Kaligram, Kashimpur, Mirat, Parail, and Raninagar. The union parishads are subdivided into 188 mauzas and 174 villages.

See also
Upazilas of Bangladesh
Districts of Bangladesh
Divisions of Bangladesh

References

External links

Upazilas of Naogaon District